The 51st edition of the Vuelta a Colombia was held from June 17 to July 2, 2001. There were a total number of 98 competitors from 13 teams.

Stages

2001-06-17: Ciudad de Popayán (8.8 km)

2001-06-18: Popayán — Cali (143 km)

2001-06-19: Palmira — Buga (46.7 km)

2001-06-20: Buga — Cartago (120 km)

2001-06-21: Cartago — Pereira (176 km)

2001-06-22: Pereira — Chinchiná (27.7 km)

2001-06-23: Chinchiná — Medellín (191 km)

2001-06-24: Medellín — El Escobero (129 km)

2001-06-25: Caldas — Manizales (182.5 km)

2001-06-26: Manizales — Honda (140.8 km)

2001-06-27: Puerto Boyacá — Barrancabermeja (203.5 km)

2001-06-28: Barrancabermeja — Bucaramanga (124.3 km)

2001-06-29: Bucaramanga — Socorro (123 km)

2001-06-30: Socorro — Tunja (169.4 km)

2001-07-01: Tunja — Bogotá (163 km)

2001-07-02: Bogotá — Alto de Patios (23.5 km)

Final classification

Teams 

Empresas Públicas de Medellín — Aguardiente Antioqueño
 Director Deportivo: Luis Carlos Mejía

Aguardiente Néctar — Cartoprin
 Director Deportivo: José Alfonso López

Baterías MAC — Selle Italia — Pacific
 Director Deportivo: Hernán Herrón

Lotería de Boyacá A
 Director Deportivo: Rafael Antonio Niño

05 Orbitel A
 Director Deportivo: José Raúl Mesa

Lotería del Táchira (Venezuela)
 Director Deportivo: Guillermo Cárdenas

Aguardiente Cristal — Liciclismo Caldas
 Director Deportivo: Rubén Darío Beltrán

Idea — Indeportes Antioquia
 Director Deportivo: Luis Fernando Otálvaro

Lotería de Boyacá B
 Director Deportivo: José Patrocinio Jiménez

05 Orbitel B
 Técnico Adjunto: Carlos Jaramillo

Triple Gordo de Trujillo (Venezuela)
 Director Deportivo: José Lindarte and Jaime Díaz

Cicloases Cundinamarca
 Director Deportivo: Leonidas Herrera

Mixto 1

See also 
 2001 Clásico RCN

References 
 cyclingnews
 pedalear

Vuelta a Colombia
Colombia
Vuelta Colombia